In geometry, the decagonal prism is the eighth in the infinite set of prisms, formed by ten square side faces and two regular decagon caps. With twelve faces, it is one of many nonregular dodecahedra. The decagonal prism has 12 faces, 30 edges, and 20 vertices, so, it is a dodecahedron (while the term is usually applied to regular dodecahedron or rhombic dodecahedron.). If faces are all regular, it is a semiregular or prismatic uniform polyhedron.

Uses 

The decagonal prism exists as cells in two four-dimensional uniform 4-polytopes:

Related polyhedra

External links
 
 3-d model of a Decagonal Prism
Prismatoid polyhedra
Zonohedra